Emerson Bell may refer to:

 Emerson Bell (artist) (1930–2006), American artist
 Emerson Bell (1866–1945), pen name of American author Gilbert Patten